Amy Skillman is an American folklorist. She has served as the academic director of the M.A. in cultural sustainability at Goucher College since 2012. In 2023, she was elected president of the American Folklore Society (AFS). She became involved with the AFS in 1978 and served on its executive board from 2009 to 2011. She is an AFS fellow and a recipient of the Botkin Prize. 

Skillman completed a self-designed B.A. in cultural minorities and the immigrant experience from St. Lawrence University. She earned a M.A. in folklore from University of California, Los Angeles.

References 

Living people
Year of birth missing (living people)
Place of birth missing (living people)
Presidents of the American Folklore Society
Women folklorists
Goucher College faculty and staff
St. Lawrence University alumni
University of California, Los Angeles alumni